The 2011 UK Open Qualifier 3 was the third of eight 2011 UK Open Darts Qualifiers which was held at the Robin Park Tennis Centre in Wigan on Saturday 12 March.

Prize money

Draw

References

3